Yasmeen Murshed is a Bangladeshi businesswoman and a former advisor of the caretaker government led by President Iajuddin Ahmed.

Biography
Murshed did her master's degree in economics in 1969 at Punjab University.

She founded Scholastica School in 1977. She is the founding chairperson of Scholastica, and chairperson of the store Etcetera Bangladesh.

She was in charge of Ministry of Women and Children Affairs, Ministry of Primary and Mass Education and Ministry of Social Welfare from 31 October 2006 to 11 January 2007. In 2007 she was made the High Commissioner of Bangladesh to Pakistan.

Personal life
She has two children Syed Maher Murshed and Syeda Madiha Murshed. She was married to Syed Tanweer Murshed, the son  of Syed Manzoor Murshed and Begum Hasina Murshed. Her father and mother, Khwaja Zakiuddin and Begum Binoo Zakiuddin, were members of the Nawab of Dhaka family. Her grandfather was Khwaja Shahabuddin. Her grandmother, Farhat Shahabuddin, was one of the first female lawmakers in Bengal.

References

Living people
Advisors of Caretaker Government of Bangladesh
High Commissioners of Bangladesh to Pakistan
Members of the Dhaka Nawab family
Bangladeshi women diplomats
Bangladeshi women ambassadors
1945 births
University of the Punjab alumni